The short-stature homeobox gene (SHOX), also known as short-stature-homeobox-containing gene, is a gene located on both the X and Y chromosomes, which is associated with short stature in humans if mutated or present in only one copy (haploinsufficiency).

Pathology
SHOX was first found during a search for the cause of short stature in women with Turner syndrome, where there is loss of genetic material from the X chromosome, typically by loss of one entire X chromosome. 

Since its discovery, the gene has been found to play a role in idiopathic short stature, Léri-Weill dyschondrosteosis, and Langer mesomelic dysplasia. 

Gene dosage effects of extra copies of SHOX may be a cause of the increased stature seen in other sex chromosome aneuploidy conditions such as triple X, XYY, Klinefelter, XXYY and similar syndromes.

Genetics and function

SHOX is composed of 6 different exons and is located in the pseudoautosomal region 1 (PAR1) of the X chromosome (Xp22.33) and Y chromosome. Since genes in PAR escape X inactivation, their dosage changes with sex chromosome aneuploidies such as Turner.

Similar genes are present in a variety of animals and insects.

It is a homeobox gene, meaning that it helps to regulate development.

References

Further reading

External links 
 
  GeneReview/NCBI/NIH/UW entry on SHOX-Related Haploinsufficiency Disorders
__notoc__

Human genes